The City of Shellharbour is a local government area in the Illawarra region of New South Wales, Australia.

The area is bordered by the City of Wollongong to the north, with the boundary being the Lake Illawarra entrance (and the suburb of Lake Illawarra) and Macquarie Rivulet (Albion Park Rail).  The Municipality of Kiama is to the south of the City of Shellharbour.

The Mayor of the Shellharbour City Council is Cr. Chris Homer.

History
Indigenous occupation of the area, particularly of Bass Point, can be traced back to 17,000 BP.

The area was discovered by Europeans Bass and Flinders in 1796. Free settlers began arriving between 1817 and 1831 and the township was founded in 1851. The Shellharbour (Municipal) Council was constituted on 4 June 1859, and was gazetted as a City in 1996. In May 2009, Shellharbour City Council celebrated its sesquicentenary.

On 13 February 2017, the New South Wales Government decided not to forcibly amalgamate Shellharbour Council with Wollongong Council.

Heritage listings 
The City of Shellharbour has a number of heritage-listed sites, including:
 Albion Park, Tullimbar Road: Toongla
 Albion Park Rail, Princes Highway: Albion Park railway station
 Dunmore, Illawarra railway: Dunmore railway station
 Shell Cove, Boollwarroo Parade: Bass Point Reserve

Suburbs

The City of Shellharbour contains the following suburbs and localities:

Council

Current composition and election method

As of 2017, Shellharbour City Council is composed of seven Councillors elected proportionally as a single ward. Councillors are elected to hold office until September 2020. Currently the mayor is chosen by the elected councillors.

At the 2017 Shellharbour council election, voters were also asked two referendum questions. The first question was whether they support the direct election of mayor and the second whether they support the implementation of a ward structure.

Current political composition of council as of 2021:

The current Council, elected in 2021, is:

Attractions
Shellharbour City has many attractions for family entertainment and recreation.
In Albion Park Rail there is a Light Rail Museum and steam trains, Historical Aircraft Restoration Society (HARS) Museum, and Albion Oval; a local sports ground. Shellharbour Village, the beach and playground are also popular attractions. Excellent fishing at Lake Illawarra and superb surfing at Warilla beach.
A cycleway goes from Oak Flats to Barrack Point. The Macquarie Valley (Shellharbour) provides scenic views and also includes the Macquarie Pass National Park.

There are various beaches in Shellharbour such as the Blacks Beach, Shellharbour North Beach, Shellharbour South Beach, Warilla Central Beach, Warilla North Beach, and Warilla South Beach which are some of the major crowd pullers.

References

External links
 Local tourist information

 
Local government areas of New South Wales
1859 establishments in Australia